Silver Bow is a neighborhood in Butte, Montana, United States. It lies near the interchange of Interstate 15 and Interstate 90, near Rocker.  It is the location of a major rail junction on the Burlington Northern Railroad. Silver Bow is at Exit 119 off I-15, near the Port of Montana. It is well known locally as the location of the Silver Bow Twin Drive-In.

Notable person
Erin Popovich, Paralympic swimmer and multiple gold medalist, was raised in Silver Bow

References

Populated places in Silver Bow County, Montana
Neighborhoods in Montana
Ghost towns in Montana